Shirogane Dam  is a rockfill dam located in Hokkaido Prefecture in Japan. The dam is used for irrigation. The catchment area of the dam is 73 km2. The dam impounds about 46  ha of land when full and can store 6800 thousand cubic meters of water. The construction of the dam was completed in 2002.

References

Dams in Hokkaido